Zalzala Koh (Earthquake Mountain) or Zalzala Jazeera (Earthquake Island) was a small island off the coast of the port city of Gwadar in Balochistan province of Pakistan which appeared on 24 September 2013 following an earthquake. As predicted by many geologists, the island soon started to submerge, with satellite images indicating the island had sunk  into the sea one month after its initial appearance. By the end of 2016, the island had disappeared.

Formation
Zalzala Koh may have been a mud volcano, located in the Arabian Sea offshore of Gwadar in Balochistan, Pakistan. It rose out of the water during a 7.7-magnitude earthquake that struck the same province on 24 September 2013.

Ali Rashid Tabriz, the head of Pakistan's National Institute of Oceanography, said that the surfacing of the island had been caused by an emission of methane gas on the seabed.

Location
These figures were debated, however.

Ecology
While the surface was lifeless, the seas around the island became a haven for fish and other life forms (including the coral Acabaria delicata), which boosted the local fishing industry.

See also
 List of islands of Pakistan
 Surtsey

References

External links
 "New Island Pakistan". Today News Gazette. Retrieved 25 September 2013.

Uninhabited islands of Pakistan
Ephemeral islands
Islands of the Arabian Sea
Volcanic islands
Islands of Gwadar
2013 in science
2013 in Pakistan
Former islands